Radev Point (‘Radev Nos’ \'ra-dev 'nos\) is a point in the southeast extremity of Rugged Island off the west coast of Byers Peninsula of Livingston Island in the South Shetland Islands, Antarctica. Kianida Reef lies 440 m southwest of the point. The feature is situated 4.5 km east of Benson Point, 1.05 km southwest of Vund Point, and 2.62 km west by south of Laager Point, Livingston Island.

The point is named after the prominent Bulgarian historiographer, writer and diplomat Simeon Radev (1879 – 1967).

Location
British mapping in 1968, Spanish in 1992 and Bulgarian in 2005 and 2009.

Maps
 Península Byers, Isla Livingston. Mapa topográfico a escala 1:25000. Madrid: Servicio Geográfico del Ejército, 1992.
 L.L. Ivanov. Antarctica: Livingston Island and Greenwich, Robert, Snow and Smith Islands. Scale 1:120000 topographic map.  Troyan: Manfred Wörner Foundation, 2009.  
 Antarctic Digital Database (ADD). Scale 1:250000 topographic map of Antarctica. Scientific Committee on Antarctic Research (SCAR). Since 1993, regularly upgraded and updated.
 L.L. Ivanov. Antarctica: Livingston Island and Smith Island. Scale 1:100000 topographic map. Manfred Wörner Foundation, 2017.

See also
List of Antarctic and subantarctic islands
Islands of Antarctica

Notes

References
 Radev Point. SCAR Composite Gazetteer of Antarctica.

External links
 Radev Point. Copernix satellite image

Headlands of the South Shetland Islands
Bulgaria and the Antarctic